Aldo Montano III (born 18 November 1978) is an Italian fencer and a five-time Olympic medalist.

He received a gold medal in sabre individual at the 2004 Summer Olympics in Athens. On 11 October 2011, he won the gold medal at the World Championships in Catania, Italy. He won a silver medal in Men's team sabre at the 2020 Summer Olympics.

Biography
He is the third generation of his family to win a fencing medal for Italy at the Olympic Games. Aldo initially took up foil, but switched to sabre so he could follow in the footsteps of his grandfather and father. His grandfather, Aldo Montano, won silver medals on the team event in sabre at the 1936 Summer Olympics and the 1948 Summer Olympics. Aldo's father, Mario Aldo Montano, was part of the Italian sabre team that won the gold medal at the 1972 Summer Olympics, and the team silver medals for sabre at the 1976 Summer Olympics, and again at the 1980 Summer Olympics. His uncles (Mario Tullio Montano and Tommaso Montano) were also on the same team as his father (at both the 1972 and 1976 Olympic events). Another uncle, Carlo Montano, won silver in team foil in 1976.

Since 2015 he was in a relationship with the Russian track and field athlete Olga Plachina, born in 1996. They got married in 2016 and as of December 2016 are expecting their first child, a girl, who they want to name Olimpia.

Achievements
Montano is one of the most successful Italian sabre fencers of all time, surpassing the success of his father and grandfather as fencers. He has five Olympic medals, one gold for the individual event in 2004 Summer Olympics, 2 silver medals for the team event in 2004 Summer Olympics and 2020 Summer Olympics and 2 bronze medals for the team events in 2008 Summer Olympics and 2012 Summer Olympics.

The gold medal bout in 2004 was a "thrilling" final against Hungary's Zsolt Nemcsik, with a final score of 15-14. Nemcsik established an early lead of 5-1, while Montano struggled with a leg cramp. The score remained close during the entire bout, with many close calls, but the final touch by Aldo demonstrated his strength on offense with a powerful redoublement attack.

Aldo Montano has also been very successful at the World Championships, having one gold medal, five silver medals and three bronze medals for individual and team events. He also has seven European Championships medals, five of them gold, as well as a gold medal from the 2005 Mediterranean Games.

Tribute

References

External links
 
 
 
 
 Aldo Montano profile from the official site of the Olympics
 

1978 births
Living people
Italian male sabre fencers
Olympic fencers of Italy
Fencers at the 2004 Summer Olympics
Fencers at the 2008 Summer Olympics
Fencers at the 2012 Summer Olympics
Fencers at the 2016 Summer Olympics
Olympic gold medalists for Italy
Olympic silver medalists for Italy
Olympic bronze medalists for Italy
Olympic medalists in fencing
Medalists at the 2012 Summer Olympics
Medalists at the 2008 Summer Olympics
Medalists at the 2004 Summer Olympics
Mediterranean Games gold medalists for Italy
Competitors at the 2005 Mediterranean Games
Sportspeople from Livorno
Mediterranean Games medalists in fencing
Fencers of Fiamme Azzurre
Fencers at the 2020 Summer Olympics
Medalists at the 2020 Summer Olympics